The Sulphur Springs Methodist Campground is a historic religious summer campground near Jonesborough, Tennessee.

This one-story open air camp meeting shed with gable on hipped
roof is rectangular, measures approximately 72 x 45 feet, and has
a nave plan. The structure is supported by hewn and pegged timber
truss work. It features a stage, unfinished plank pews, and a
packed earth and sawdust floor. Sulphur Springs Methodist Campground was founded following the
Great Revival of 1800. First meetings here may have occurred as
early as 1815. In 1842 temporary brush arbors were abandoned
for a more permanent structural complex. The present shed as well
as the other buildings, now extinct, were reconstructed according
to the same plan and shape and utilizing the same materials in
1900.

References

Churches on the National Register of Historic Places in Tennessee
Buildings and structures completed in 1900
Buildings and structures in Washington County, Tennessee
National Register of Historic Places in Washington County, Tennessee
Methodism in Tennessee
Campgrounds in the United States